De Klassieker (The Classic) is the main football rivalry of the Netherlands, between Ajax (of Amsterdam) and Feyenoord (of Rotterdam). The record attendance was on 9 January 1966, when 65,562 watched in Rotterdam.

History

Amsterdam vs Rotterdam
The rivalry between these two clubs goes beyond the football rivalry, it transcends into the city rivalry between Amsterdam and Rotterdam. This city rivalry began when these two cities first received their city rights in the 13th century. The football clubs are the pride of these cities; Ajax to Amsterdam and Feyenoord to Rotterdam.

The inhabitants of these cities differ extremely in both attitudes and cultures which is clearly reflected on to the football pitch. The clash is seen as between the artists of Amsterdam and the workers of Rotterdam. Amsterdam is renowned for its culture, having produced many artists and actors. Ajax’s style of play has long been a source of pride for the supporters, and one of irritation for the Feyenoord fans. The Rotterdammers feel that those hailing from Amsterdam possess delusions of grandeur, and there is a saying to reflect these sentiments: "While Amsterdam dreams, Rotterdam works".
Rotterdam was forced to work after being bombed heavily in the Second World War by the Nazis. A harbour town, its people are proud of their work ethic, and resentful of Amsterdam's showiness.

Ajax vs Feyenoord 
The first encounter between these two clubs was on 9 October 1921 in Rotterdam which was surrounded by controversy. The match initially ended 3–2 in Ajax' favour. This was later officially declared 2–2 due to Feyenoords protest to what they believed was a dubious goal by Ajax.

There has also been a competition as who has the biggest stadium between these two clubs which mainly occurred in the 1930s and 1940s. This was done as bragging rights as which city, between Amsterdam and Rotterdam, had the biggest stadium in the Netherlands. The Olympic Stadium was constructed in 1928 and had a capacity of 31,600 which was the biggest in the Netherlands. In 1934 De Meer Stadion was constructed with a capacity of 22,000. Ajax used the Olympic Stadium for European matches and De Meer for domestic matches. The status of the Olympic Stadium being the largest in Netherlands would change in 1937 when Feyenoord opened De Kuip was constructed with a capacity of 64,000. Ajax responded by adding a second ring to Olympic Stadium, also in 1937. After the Second World War, Feyenoord expanded De Kuip to 69,000 in 1949.

From the season 1947–48 up to and including 1955–56 no competitive matches were played between these two clubs. This was due to Feyenoord never winning their regional league in this period and hence not reaching the Championship Playoff where they could face Ajax. In order for these clubs to continue playing each other during this period a number of friendlies were arranged. Once the Eredivise was introduced in 1956–57, regional leagues were abolished in favour of a single national league and hence no championship playoffs were needed. Therefore, Feyenoord and Ajax were able to play competitive matches against each other once more. The two clubs have faced off once a year since then.

In the season 1960/61 the highest scoring match between these two occurred. The total number of goals scored was 14 where the score was 9–5 in the favour of Feyenoord. This season Feyenoord won the league with Ajax being second place with 2 points behind first place. Four years later in the season 1964/65 the same scoreline was almost replicated by a 9–4 scoreline in Feyenoords favour.

This rivalry heated up considerably in the early 1970s when these two clubs were arguably the best in the world and riots started to break between the sets of fans. During the early 1970s Ajax won 3 European Cups and 1 Intercontinental Cup, Feyenoord had won one European Cup, one Intercontinental Cup and one UEFA Cup. All these trophies won by Feyenoord at the time were the first to be won by a Dutch club. This success led to the Netherlands squad being filled with a majority of Ajax and Feyenoord players. These players would be important during the 1974 FIFA World Cup and 1978 FIFA World Cup in which they displayed what is known to be Total Football.

During the season 1980/81, Feyenoord legend Wim Jansen, who played for Feyenoord for 15 years, made the leap to Ajax which created much anger for the Feyenoord fans. On his debut for Ajax, which happened to be an away game against Feyenoord, a Feyenoord fan threw an iceball in Jansen's eye, forcing him to leave the field for treatment. The rivalry intensified even further during the 1983/84 season when Ajax legend Johan Cruyff made the transfer from Ajax to Feyenoord. This was after a contract dispute between Cruyff and Ajax; Cruyff wanted a contract extension, but Ajax balked on account of his age. This transfer angered both fanbases; Ajax fans were outraged that Cruyff had jumped to their biggest rival, while Feyenoord fans did not like the fact that an Ajax legend would be joining their club. Some Feyenoord fans protested his arrival by hanging banners saying "Feyenoord Forever, Cruijff Never" being one of the more civilised ones. Many fans would also whistle and jeer at the newcomer during the friendly pre season games and whenever his name was announced in the stadium. Some fans even refused to enter the stadium whilst Cruyff played there. In the 1983/84 season, Feyenoord and Cruyff lost 8–2 to Ajax which was Feyenoord's worst loss to them ever. However Feyenoord ended up winning the league and cup.

Both clubs have fallen from grace over the years, while fan violence has increased, and there is always a heavy police presence at the derby. The most serious incident occurred in the Beverwijk clash in 1997 when Ajax fan Carlo Picornie was killed and several others injured. The riots of 2005 were also a depressing chapter in the history of the two clubs.

Violence between Ajax and Feyenoord

Since the 70's there have been many clashes between the supporters of both clubs, of which Beverwijk in 1997 was infamous. One Ajax fan, Carlo Picornie, was beaten to death by rival supporters, triggering more strict policies from the Dutch football association KNVB to tackle hooliganism.
As a result of the incident, the two Klassiekers in 1997/98 were played without away fans.

In 2004 Feyenoord player Jorge Acuña was taken to hospital with head, neck and rib injuries after Feyenoord players were attacked by Ajax hooligans during a match between the reserve teams of both clubs. Another Feyenoord player, Robin van Persie, had to be rescued by Ajax coach John van 't Schip and player Daniël de Ridder.

In April 2005, riots took place around Feyenoord's ground involving hooligans from both sides and the riot police. Travelling Ajax fans had demolished the train transporting them to Rotterdam, and were forced to wait outside the stadium until the match was over. Meanwhile, Feyenoord supporters who had just seen their team lose 2:3, were determined to clash with rivals from Amsterdam, who had not seen the match. 
Hooligans filmed by police were shown on national TV. Virtually every hooligan on TV handed himself in.

In February 2009, the mayors of Amsterdam and Rotterdam made an agreement with the KNVB to ban visiting fans from the away games for the next five seasons in an effort to curb the violence. However, after Ajax fans threw fireworks on the field during the 2014 KNVB Cup Final, Ajax banned its supporters from traveling to Rotterdam through at least the 2016-17 season.

In March 2015, the Ajax clubhouse was burned down for which the cause is officially unknown. However the police and Ajax fans suspected Feyenoord fans to have been behind this event. Ajax hooligans planned a revenge attack on Feyenoord fans but were stopped by police.

In February 2016, an incident took place in Amsterdam Arena where an effigy of Kenneth Vermeer, who made the crossing from Ajax to Feyenoord, was hanged from a stand occupied by the Ajax ultra group VAK410. In response, Ajax closed the sections normally used by VAK410 for the next edition of De Klassieker at the Arena, and banned season ticketholders from those sections from attending the match.

Hooligans often chant anti-Jewish slogans when their team faces Ajax. That is because Ajax has had a long association with the city's Jewish community. And Ajax supporters sometimes refer to themselves as Jews and use the Star of David symbol.

In May 2019, an amateur match between AVV Swift, of Amsterdam, and SC Feyenoord in Amsterdam was marred by fan trouble after the game when Feyenoord fans travelled to Amsterdam to show support for SC Feyenoord and came into contact with Ajax fans who were there to show support for AVV Swift. Later in the same month, there was an incident during the U19 league title deciding game between Ajax and Feyenoord at De Toekomst in Amsterdam. Before the game, Ajax fans threw stones the players bus of Feyenoord U19. After 30 minutes, the match had to be suspended due to Ajax fans trying to attack the Feyenoord players' families in the stands. The match had to be rescheduled to a later date where no fans were allowed to attend the fixture.

Honours
Ajax and Feyenoord are the first and third most successful clubs in the Netherlands respectively, with Ajax winning more silverware than Feyenoord in nearly every competition: 75 to 36. This total includes both domestic and international trophies. Both clubs had their greatest international success in the early 1970s, when they were considered to be two of the best clubs in the world. During this time, Ajax won three European Cups, whereas Feyenoord won one European Cup and one UEFA Cup.

Statistics (since 1921)

Results (since 1921)

Records

All-time top scorers

Highest-scoring matches (8+ goals)

Crossing the divide

There have been quite a few players who have played for both Ajax and Feyenoord. The most controversial players being Johan Cruyff, Wim Jansen and most recently Steven Berghuis. Hans Kraay Sr. and Leo Beenhakker have trained both clubs (with Kraay Sr. also having played at Feyenoord), while Peter Bosz was technical director at Feyenoord and later coach at Ajax. Ronald Koeman is the only former player and coach to hold the distinction of playing and coaching at the 'Big Three' of Dutch professional football, having been both a player and a coach at Feyenoord, Ajax and their Eindhoven rivals PSV.

From Feyenoord to Ajax 

Henk Groot – 1965 direct transfer
Ruud Geels – 1974 not a direct transfer between the clubs 
Jan Everse – 1977 direct transfer
Wim Jansen – 1980 not a direct transfer between the clubs 
Jan Sørensen – 1987 not a direct transfer between the clubs 
Arnold Scholten – 1995 direct transfer
Dean Gorré – 1997 not a direct transfer between the clubs 
Richard Knopper – played in the Feyenoord youth system 
Henk Timmer – 2002 direct loan transfer
Leonardo – 2007 not a direct transfer between the clubs 
Evander Sno – 2008 not a direct transfer between the clubs 
Ronald Graafland – 2010 direct transfer 
Anwar El Ghazi – 2013 played in the Feyenoord youth system 
Kostas Lamprou – 2017 not a direct transfer between the clubs 
Oussama Idrissi - 2021 played in the Feyenoord youth system 
Steven Berghuis – 2021 direct transfer

From Ajax to Feyenoord

Eddy Pieters Graafland – 1958 direct transfer
Henk Groot – 1963 direct transfer
Theo van Duivenbode – 1969 direct transfer
René Notten – 1978 direct transfer
Johan Cruijff – 1983 direct transfer
Johnny Rep – 1984 not a direct transfer between the clubs
Simon Tahamata – 1984 not a direct transfer between the clubs
Keje Molenaar – 1985 not a direct transfer between the clubs
Tscheu La Ling 1986 not a direct transfer between the clubs
Martin van Geel – 1988 not a direct transfer between the clubs
Arnold Scholten – 1989 direct transfer
Rob Witschge – 1990 not a direct transfer between the clubs
Harvey Esajas – 1992 played in the Ajax youth system 
John van Loen – 1993 direct transfer
Ronald Koeman – 1995 not a direct transfer between the clubs
Peter van Vossen – 1998 not a direct transfer between the clubs
Diego Biseswar – 2001 played in the Ajax youth system 
Evander Sno – 2005 played in the Ajax youth system 
Henk Timmer – 2006 not a direct transfer between the clubs
Angelos Charisteas – 2006 direct transfer
Tim de Cler – 2007 not a direct transfer between the clubs
Ronald Graafland – 2011 direct transfer 
John Goossens – 2012 played in the Ajax youth system 
Bilal Basacikoglu – 2014 played in the Ajax youth system
Warner Hahn – 2014 not a direct transfer between the clubs
Kenneth Vermeer – 2014 direct transfer 
Marko Vejinović – 2015 played in the Ajax youth system 
Jan-Arie van der Heijden – 2015 not a direct transfer between the clubs
Eljero Elia – 2015 played in the Ajax youth system
Danilo – 2022 direct free transfer

Managers
Hans Kraay was manager at Ajax during 1974/75 and at Feyenoord during 1982/83 and 1988/89.
Leo Beenhakker has been a manager at both clubs numerous times.
Ronald Koeman was manager at Ajax during 2002 and 2005, was Feyenoord manager during 2011 and 2014.
Peter Bosz played for Feyenoord between 1991 en 1996, was technical director for Feyenoord during 2006 and 2009. Became Ajax manager in 2016.

See also 
 Big Three (Netherlands)
 AFC Ajax–PSV Eindhoven rivalry
 Amsterdam derby
 Rotterdam derby
 Twentse Derby
 List of association football rivalries

References

External links
Geschiedenis van de Klassieker: Ajax-Feyenoord (History of the Classic: Ajax-Feyenoord) (Dutch, translation available)
AFC Ajax
Feyenoord

AFC Ajax
Feyenoord
Football derbies in the Netherlands
Articles containing video clips
Nicknamed sporting events